Hirsh is a surname. Notable people with the surname include:

Carolyn Hirsh, Australian politician
David Hirsh, British academic
David Julian Hirsh, Canadian actor
Ed Hirsh, special effects artist
 Elijah Hirsh (born 1997), American-Israeli basketball player in the Israeli Basketball Premier League
Jason Hirsh (born 1982), American major league baseball pitcher
Michael Hirsh (disambiguation), the name of many different people
Nurit Hirsh, Israeli composer, arranger, and conductor
Tzvi Hirsh of Zidichov, Hasidic rabbi and the founder of the Zidichov Hasidic Judaism dynasty

See also 
Hirsch (disambiguation)
Herz (disambiguation)
Hersh
Hersch
Hirche